Fletchall Township is an inactive township in Worth County, in the U.S. state of Missouri.

Fletchall Township has the name of John Fletchall, a pioneer citizen.

References

Townships in Missouri
Townships in Worth County, Missouri